Inbar, is a feminine given name meaning "amber" in Hebrew.

Inbar Bakal, Israeli singer-songwriter
Inbar Lavi, Israeli-American actress
Inbar Vinarsky, Israeli female former volleyball player

Hebrew feminine given names